The first competition weekend of the 2009–10 ISU Speed Skating World Cup was held in the Sportforum Hohenschönhausen in Berlin, Germany, from Friday, 6 November, until Sunday, 8 November 2009.

Schedule of events
The schedule of the event is below.

Medal summary

Men's events

Women's events

References

Results

1
Isu World Cup, 2009-10, 1
Speed skating in Berlin
2009 in Berlin